Mathilde Keis Storgaard (born 13 February 1995) is a Danish handball player who currently plays for Skanderborg Håndbold.

Achievements 
EHF Cup:
Semifinalist: 2018, 2019
Danish Cup:
Silver Medalist: 2015
Bronze Medalist: 2016

References

1995 births
Living people
Danish female handball players
Viborg HK players
People from Køge
Sportspeople from Region Zealand